Tyson Brett Ballou (born November 14, 1976) is an American male model. He has appeared in numerous advertising campaigns and editorials for major fashion brands and publications.

Career
Born in Garland, Texas, Ballou began modeling at the age of 15 years discovered by Page Parkes, appearing in magazines and shows in Texas. Later on, he began modeling in New York City under the Ford Modeling Agency, but later signed with another agency, IMG.

References

External links
Profile, imgmodels.com; accessed February 24, 2015.

1976 births
Living people
Male models from Texas
People from Garland, Texas
IMG Models models